The College of Arts, Law and Education was founded in 2017 as a college of the University of Tasmania that incorporated the School of Humanities, the School of Social Sciences, the School of Creative Arts (formerly the Tasmanian College of the Arts) and the Faculties of Law and Education. The College offers undergraduate, postgraduate and research programs.

The Colleges hosts a number of institutes including the Institute for the Study of Social Change, the Tasmanian Law Reform Institute, and the Asia Institute Tasmania.

History
The College was established in March 2017 after the merging of the School of Humanities, the School of Social Sciences, the School of Creative Arts (formerly the Tasmanian College of the Arts) and the Faculties of Law and Education as a single entity. The College model followed other Australian Universities in the combining of academic units to promote further interdisciplinary teaching and research as well as a streamlined administrative process.

Schools and Faculties
The College hosts five schools and facilitates which offers undergraduate, postgraduate and research programs.

School of Creative Arts and Media

The School of Creative Arts offers Art and Design, Media, Music and Theatre and Performance studies and research curricula. The School operates five Gallery spaces across Tasmania, the Plimsoll Gallery and the Entrepôt Gallery based at the School's Hunter Street Campus in Hobart, the Academy Gallery and Powerhouse Gallery in Launceston, and the Makers' Space Gallery in Burnie.

Research centres and Institutes
Australian Music and Art Research Group

Faculty of Education

School of Humanities
The School of Humanities focuses on the study and research of English, Global Cultures and Languages, History and Classics, and Philosophy and Gender Studies. Much of the School's research is significantly focused on the Universities 'Creativity, Culture and Society' research theme.

Research centres and Institutes
Asia Institute Tasmania
Institute for the Study of Social Change
Centre for Tasmanian Historical Studies (CTHS)
Experimental Histories Research Group
Oceanic Cultures and Connections Research Group
Antarctic Engagements Research Group
Environmental Change Research Group
Animal Studies Research Group

Faculty of Law
The Faculty of Law (formally the School of Law) was founded in 1893 and is the fourth oldest law school in Australia. The University of Tasmania Law Review and the Journal of Law, Information and Science are based within the Faculty as well as numerous publications produced by the Tasmanian Law Reform Institute.

In addition to its academic programme, the law faculty promotes a range of co-curricular activities including mooting, negotiation and client interview competitions, membership of the University of Tasmania Law Review student editorial, and membership of law students' societies the Tasmania University Law Society (TULS) and the Student Environment and Animal Law Society (SEALS) which provides opportunities for law students to become engaged in environmental law in such a way which encourages the building of legal skills and professional connections.

Research centres and Institutes

Australian Forum for Climate Intervention Governance
Tasmania Law Reform Institute
Centre for Law and Genetics
Climate Justice Network
Journal of Law, Information and Science
University of Tasmania Law Review

School of Social Sciences
The School of Social Sciences focuses on Political Science, International Relations, Social Work Sociology and Criminology. The School's research focus has been assessed at world-class and above world standards levels.

Tasmanian Institute of Law Enforcement Studies (TILES)
Housing and Community Research Unit (HACRU]
Criminology Research Unit(CRU)
Criminology, Law and Police Studies Research Group (CLPS)
Disaster Resilience Research Group
Future Energy Research Group

Notable alumni

Judges
Sir Stanley Burbury, KCMG, KCVO, KBE, Chief Justice of Tasmania 1956–1973
Ewan Crawford, former Chief Justice and Lieutenant-Governor of Tasmania
Sir William Lambert Dobson, KCMG, FLS, Chief Justice of Tasmania 1885–1898 
Sir John Stokell Dodds, KCMG, Chief Justice of Tasmania 1898–1914
Stephen Estcourt QC, Tasmanian Supreme Court judge 
Philip Lewis Griffiths, former Chief Judge of the Mandated Territory of New Guinea
Peter Heerey AM, QC, former Judge of the Federal Court of Australia
Duncan Kerr, Judge of the Federal Court of Australia, President of the Administrative Appeals Tribunal and former Attorney-General of Australia
Davendra Pathik, former Judge of the Supreme Court of Fiji

Legal practitioners
Damian Bugg, former Commonwealth and Tasmanian Director of Public Prosecutions
Michael Mansell, Aboriginal rights activist and lawyer

Legal academics
Enid Campbell AC, former Dean of Monash University Faculty of Law and first female law professor in Australasia 
Kate Warner AM, current Governor of Tasmania and legal academic

Politics and government
Eric Abetz, Senator for Tasmania 
Guy Barnett, Senator for Tasmania 
David Bushby, Chief Government Whip in the Senate 
Roy Fagan, former Deputy Premier of Tasmania
Adrian Gibson OAM, former Liberal politician and barrister
Lara Giddings, Labor politician and former Premier of Tasmania
Bill Hodgman, OBE, QC, former President of the Tasmanian Legislative Council
Michael Hodgman AM, QC, former Liberal politician and barrister 
Will Hodgman, Premier of Tasmania
Michael Tate, former Labor politician and diplomat, legal academic and Catholic priest 
Peter Underwood, former Governor of Tasmania
Hannah Yeoh, speaker of the Selangor State Legislative Assembly

Diplomacy
Ralph Harry AC, CBE, Diplomat and former Ambassador to the United Nations

Business
Andrew MacLeod, businessman, author, former humanitarian lawyer and aid worker

References

External links 
 

Schools and Faculties of the University of Tasmania
Law schools in Australia